is a passenger railway station located in the city of Akiruno, Tokyo, Japan, operated by East Japan Railway Company (JR East).

Lines 
Musashi-Masuko Station is served by the Itsukaichi Line, and is located 8.5 kilometers from the starting point of the line at Haijima Station.

Station layout 
This station consists of one side platform and one island platform, with a small station building located adjacent to the side platform; however, track 3 on the outside of the island platform is not normally used, and is used as a siding at night. The station is staffed.

Platforms

History

With the privatization of Japanese National Railways (JNR) on 1 April 1987, the station came under the control of JR East. A new station building was completed in March 2011.

Surrounding area
 Masuko Post Office
 Masuko Elementary School
 Masuko Junior High School

Passenger statistics
In fiscal 2019, the station was used by an average of 2,481 passengers daily (boarding passengers only).

The passenger figures for previous years are as shown below.

See also
 List of railway stations in Japan

References

External links

JR East station information 

Railway stations in Japan opened in 1925
Railway stations in Tokyo
Akiruno, Tokyo
Itsukaichi Line